The men's tournament of volleyball at the 2013 Summer Universiade was held from 6 to 16 July in Kazan, Russia.

Preliminary round
The draw is as follows:

Group A

|}

|}

Group B

|}

|}

Group C

|}

|}

Group D

|}

|}

Classification rounds

Quarterfinal round

17th–21st place

|}

9th–16th place

|}

Semifinal round

17th–20th place

|}

13th–16th place

|}

9th–12th place

|}

5th–8th place

|}

Final round

19th place game

|}

17th place game

|}

15th place game

|}

13th place game

|}

11th place game

|}

9th place game

|}

7th place game

|}

5th place game

|}

Final round

Quarterfinals

|}

Semifinals

|}

Bronze-medal match

|}

Gold-medal match

|}

Final standings

References

Men